Gorgonzola is a veined PDO Italian blue cheese, made from unskimmed cow's milk. It can be buttery or firm, crumbly and quite salty, with a "bite" from its blue veining. Outside the EU and the countries recognizing the geographical origin protection, the name "Gorgonzola" can legally be used for similar cheeses, with only the full Italian name unambiguously referring to PDO Gorgonzola. It is a famously pungent cheese.

History 

Historically, Gorgonzola has been produced for centuries in Gorgonzola, Milan, acquiring its greenish-blue marbling in the 11th century. However, the town's claim of geographical origin is disputed by other nearby localities.

For example, another possible place of origin is the  well known cheese-making area known for ancient dairy traditions, Pasturo nella Valsassina. This is because of the presence of superb natural caves that stay at the perfect temperature (between 6 and 12 degrees Celsius) to make Gorgonzola and many other cheeses. Gorgonzola was supposedly created in the Middle Ages from the years 879-1007 AD.

There is a Lombardy legend of Gorgonzola’s origin where a cheese maker added new fresh curds to a vat and left it open all night. He apparently forgot about the curds because he was in a rush to meet his lover. He attempted to fix his mistake and added fresh curds to the vat and a few months later he was surprised with a new bluish mold that had grown on his cheese. He tasted this and realized the surprisingly great and unique taste of the cheese. This was also the first discovery of the process of erborinatura, the creation of mold.

Ever since the beginning of the 20th century, popularity of the cheese has been steadily increasing, more so abroad with past exports breaking the tens thousand tons per year. Exports include the UK, France, and Germany. Each country has specific types of the cheese it perfers. British people enjoy the softer white and spicy Gorgonzola, while French and Germans like blue veined strong Gorgonzola. Gorgonzola was discovered to be on the RMS Titanic and Sir Winston Churchill, the English politician, was a big fan of Gorgonzola. His love for the cheese was so great that during the Second World War, the town of Gorgonzola and its dairies were prohibited from being bombed by the British.

After World War II, the new technique called the “one-curd” processing method was introduced. This production fixed the prior problems of the production with hygiene, quality, and costs. However, during the 1970s when hundreds of cheese factories modernized like this, it caused various smaller producers to go out of business since they were not able to bear the costs of modernizing.

Production 

Today, Gorgonzola is mainly produced in the northern Italian regions of Piedmont and Lombardy. The whey is removed during curdling, and the result is aged at low temperatures.

During the ageing process, metal rods are quickly inserted and removed, creating air channels that allow the mould spores to grow into hyphae and cause the cheese's characteristic veining.  Gorgonzola is typically aged for three to four months.  The length of the ageing process determines the consistency of the cheese, which gets firmer as it ripens.  There are two varieties of Gorgonzola, which differ mainly in their age: the less aged Gorgonzola Dolce (also called Sweet Gorgonzola), which can have a less salty taste and a slightly sweet finish, and the more aged Gorgonzola Piccante (also called Gorgonzola Naturale, Gorgonzola Montagna, or Mountain Gorgonzola).

Protected designation of origin 

Under EU law, Gorgonzola has been registered as a Protected Designation of Origin (PDO, or Denominazione di Origine Protetta (DOP) in Italy) since 1996. This means that Gorgonzola sold in the European Union can only be produced in the provinces of Novara, Bergamo, Brescia, Como, Cremona, Cuneo, Lecco, Lodi, Milan, Pavia, Varese, Verbano-Cusio-Ossola and Vercelli, as well as several comuni in the area of Casale Monferrato (province of Alessandria).  As a Geographical indication, Gorgonzola produced in parts of Italy is protected in certain countries based on bilateral agreements of the European Union, membership of the Lisbon Agreement or national registration as a certification mark.

Non-European Gorgonzola cheese

Over time, production of the cheese outside Europe has led to the genericization of the term "gorgonzola" in certain parts of the world, including in Australia. Gorgonzola cheese made outside of the European Union is a family of blue cheeses made from cows’ milk and inspired by the original Italian cheese. Whole cow's milk is used, to which starter bacteria are added with spores of the mould Penicillium glaucum.

The United States Food and Drug Administration has established what is known as standards of identity (SOIs).  SOIs establish the common name for food and define the basic nature of that food and its ingredients.  The US Code of Federal Regulations Title 21—Food and Drugs, Chapter I--Food and Drug Administration, Subchapter B--Food for Human Consumption establishes the production process of "gorgonzola" cheese.  This SOI, in addition to establishing "gorgonzola" as the product name for this type of cheese for production in the United States, would also apply to any "gorgonzola" cheese imported from non-United States countries.

Consumption 
Gorgonzola may be eaten in many ways, as with all blue cheeses. It is often added to salads, either straight or as part of a blue cheese dressing. Combined with other soft cheeses, it is an ingredient of pizza ai quattro formaggi (four-cheese pizza). It is often used as a topping for steak, sometimes as a sauce with Port or other sweet wine. It may be melted into a risotto in the final stage of cooking and gnocchi or served alongside polenta.

Nutrition is as follows: 1 ounce (28 grams) of gorgonzola contains 100 calories, 9 g of fat, 375 mg of sodium, 1 g of carbohydrate and 6 g of protein. It contains 5.3 g of saturated fat.

Literary References 
James Joyce, in his 1922 novel Ulysses, gives his hero Bloom a lunch of "a glass of Burgundy and a Gorgonzola sandwich". In his 1972 book Ulysses on the Liffey, critic and Joyce scholar Richard Ellmann suggests that "Besides serving as a parable that life breeds corruption, Gorgonzola is probably chosen also because of Dante's adventures with the Gorgon in the Inferno IX. Bloom masters the monster by digesting her."

References

External links 

 Consortium for the Protection of Gorgonzola Cheese

Cow's-milk cheeses
Blue cheeses
Italian products with protected designation of origin
Cheeses with designation of origin protected in the European Union
Lombard cheeses